Qaidi is a 1962 Pakistani film directed by Najam Naqvi. It was produced by Agha G. A. Gul under banner Evernew Studio. It stars Shamim Ara and Darpan. The film festures the evergreen poem of Faiz Ahmad Faiz, Mujh Se Pehli Si Mohabbat Mere Mehboob Na Maang and sung by Noor Jehan.

Cast 

 Shamim Ara
 Darpan
 Agha Talish
 Nazr
 Lehri
 Allauddin
 Salma Mumtaz
 Panna
 Himalya Wala
 Sultan Rahi (extra)

Soundtrack 

All music was composed Rashid Attre.

References

External links